Social anxiety disorder (SAD), also known as social phobia, is an anxiety disorder characterized by sentiments of fear and anxiety in social situations, causing considerable distress and impaired ability to function in at least some aspects of daily life. These fears can be triggered by perceived or actual scrutiny from others. Individuals with social anxiety disorder fear negative evaluations from other people.

Physical symptoms often include excessive blushing, excess sweating, trembling, palpitations, and nausea. Stammering may be present, along with rapid speech. Panic attacks can also occur under intense fear and discomfort. Some affected individuals may use alcohol or other drugs to reduce fears and inhibitions at social events. It is common for those with social phobia to self-medicate in this fashion, especially if they are undiagnosed, untreated, or both; this can lead to alcohol use disorder, eating disorders or other kinds of substance use disorders. SAD is sometimes referred to as an illness of lost opportunities where "individuals make major life choices to accommodate their illness". According to ICD-10 guidelines, the main diagnostic criteria of social phobia are fear of being the focus of attention, or fear of behaving in a way that will be embarrassing or humiliating, avoidance and anxiety symptoms. Standardized rating scales can be used to screen for social anxiety disorder and measure the severity of anxiety.

The first line of treatment for social anxiety disorder is cognitive behavioral therapy (CBT). Medications such as SSRIs are effective for social phobia, especially paroxetine. CBT is effective in treating this disorder, whether delivered individually or in a group setting. The cognitive and behavioral components seek to change thought patterns and physical reactions to anxiety-inducing situations. The attention given to social anxiety disorder has significantly increased since 1999 with the approval and marketing of drugs for its treatment. Prescribed medications include several classes of antidepressants: selective serotonin reuptake inhibitors (SSRIs), serotonin–norepinephrine reuptake inhibitors (SNRIs), and monoamine oxidase inhibitors (MAOIs). Other commonly used medications include beta blockers and benzodiazepines.

History
Literary descriptions of shyness can be traced back to the days of Hippocrates around 400 B.C. Hippocrates described someone who "through bashfulness, suspicion, and timorousness, will not be seen abroad; loves darkness as life and cannot endure the light or to sit in lightsome places; his hat still in his eyes, he will neither see, nor be seen by his good will. He dare not come in company for fear he should be misused, disgraced, overshoot himself in gesture or speeches, or be sick; he thinks every man observes him."

The first mention of the psychiatric term "social phobia" (phobie des situations sociales) was made in the early 1900s. Psychologists used the term "social neurosis" to describe extremely shy patients in the 1930s. After extensive work by Joseph Wolpe on systematic desensitization, research on phobias and their treatment grew. The idea that social phobia was a separate entity from other phobias came from the British psychiatrist Isaac Marks in the 1960s. This was accepted by the American Psychiatric Association and was first officially included in the third edition of the Diagnostic and Statistical Manual of Mental Disorders. The definition of the phobia was revised in 1989 to allow comorbidity with avoidant personality disorder and introduced generalized social phobia. Social phobia had been largely ignored prior to 1985.

After a call to action by psychiatrist Michael Liebowitz and clinical psychologist Richard Heimberg, there was an increase in attention to and research on the disorder. The DSM-IV gave social phobia the alternative name "social anxiety disorder". Research on the psychology and sociology of everyday social anxiety continued. Cognitive Behavioural models and therapies were developed for social anxiety disorder. In the 1990s, paroxetine became the first prescription drug in the U.S. approved to treat social anxiety disorder, with others following.

Signs and symptoms
The 10th version of the International Classification of Diseases (ICD-10) classifies social anxiety as a mental and behavioral disorder.

Cognitive aspects
In cognitive models of social anxiety disorder, those with social phobias experience dread over how they will present to others. They may feel overly self-conscious, pay high self-attention after the activity, or have high performance standards for themselves. According to the social psychology theory of self-presentation, an affected person attempts to create a well-mannered impression towards others but believes they are unable to do so. Many times, before the potentially anxiety-provoking social situation, they may deliberately review what could go wrong and how to deal with each unexpected case.  After the event, they may have the perception that they performed unsatisfactorily. Consequently, they will perceive anything that may have possibly been abnormal as embarrassing. These thoughts may extend for weeks or longer. Cognitive distortions are a hallmark and are learned about in CBT (cognitive-behavioral therapy). Thoughts are often self-defeating and inaccurate. Those with social phobia tend to interpret neutral or ambiguous conversations with a negative outlook and many studies suggest that socially anxious individuals remember more negative memories than those less distressed.

An example of an instance may be that of an employee presenting to their co-workers. During the presentation, the person may stutter a word, upon which they may worry that other people significantly noticed and think that their perceptions of them as a presenter have been tarnished. This cognitive thought propels further anxiety which compounds further stuttering, sweating, and, potentially, a panic attack.

Behavioural aspects
Social anxiety disorder is a persistent fear of one or more situations in which the person is exposed to possible scrutiny by others and fears that they may do something or act in a way that will be humiliating or embarrassing. It exceeds normal "shyness" as it leads to excessive social avoidance and substantial social or occupational impairment. Feared activities may include almost any type of social interaction, especially small groups, dating, parties, talking to strangers, restaurants, interviews, etc.

Those who have social anxiety disorder fear being judged by others in society. In particular, individuals with social anxiety are nervous in the presence of people with authority and feel uncomfortable during physical examinations. People who have this disorder may behave a certain way or say something and then feel embarrassed or humiliated after. As a result, they often choose to isolate themselves from society to avoid such situations. They may also feel uncomfortable meeting people they do not know and act distant when they are with large groups of people. In some cases, they may show evidence of this disorder by avoiding eye contact, or blushing when someone is talking to them.

According to psychologist B. F. Skinner, phobias are controlled by escape and avoidance behaviors. For instance, a student may leave the room when talking in front of the class (escape) and refrain from doing verbal presentations because of the previously encountered anxiety attack (avoid). Major avoidance behaviors could include an almost pathological or compulsive lying behavior to preserve self-image and avoid judgment in front of others. Minor avoidance behaviors are exposed when a person avoids eye contact and crosses his/her arms to conceal recognizable shaking. A fight-or-flight response is then triggered in such events.

Physiological aspects
Physiological effects, similar to those in other anxiety disorders, are present in social phobias. In adults, it may cause tears as well as excessive sweating, nausea, difficulty breathing, shaking, and palpitations as a result of the fight-or-flight response. The walk disturbance (where a person is so worried about how they walk that they may lose balance) may appear, especially when passing a group of people. Blushing is commonly exhibited by individuals with social phobia. These visible symptoms further reinforce the anxiety in the presence of others. A 2006 study found that the area of the brain called the amygdala, part of the limbic system, is hyperactive when patients are shown threatening faces or confronted with frightening situations. They found that patients with more severe social phobia showed a correlation with increased response in their amygdalae. People with SAD may avoid looking at other people, and even their surroundings, to a greater extent than their peers, possibly to decrease the risk of eye contact, which can be interpreted as a nonverbal signal of openness to social interaction.

Social aspects
People with SAD avoid situations that most people consider "normal". They may have a hard time understanding how others can handle these situations so easily. People with SAD avoid all or most social situations and hide from others, which can affect their personal relationships. Social phobia can completely remove people from social situations due to the irrational fear of these situations. People with SAD may be addicted to social media networks, have sleep deprivation, and feel good when they avoid human interactions. SAD can also lead to low self-esteem, negative thoughts, major depressive disorder, sensitivity to criticism, and poor social skills that don't improve. People with SAD experience anxiety in a variety of social situations, from important, meaningful encounters, to everyday trivial ones. These people may feel more nervous in job interviews, dates, interactions with authority, or at work.

Comorbidity
SAD shows a high degree of co-occurrence with other psychiatric disorders. In fact, a population-based study found that 66% of those with SAD had one or more additional mental health disorders. SAD often occurs alongside low self-esteem and most commonly clinical depression, perhaps due to a lack of personal relationships and long periods of isolation related to social avoidance.
Clinical depression is 1.49 to 3.5 times more likely to occur in those with SAD. Research also indicates that the presence of certain social fears (e.g., avoidance of participating in small groups, avoidance of going to a party) are more likely to trigger comorbid depressive symptoms than other social fears, and thus deserve a very careful audit during clinical assessment among patients with SAD.

Anxiety disorders other than SAD are also very common in patients with SAD, in particular generalized anxiety disorder. Avoidant personality disorder is likewise highly correlated with SAD, with comorbidity rates ranging from 25% to 89%.

To try to reduce their anxiety and alleviate depression, people with social phobia may use alcohol or other drugs, which can lead to substance use disorders. It is estimated that one-fifth of patients with social anxiety disorder also have alcohol use disorder. However, some research suggests SAD is unrelated to, or even protective against alcohol-related problems. Those who have both alcohol use disorder and social anxiety disorder are more likely to avoid group-based treatments and to relapse compared to people who do not have this combination.

Causes
Research into the causes of social anxiety and social phobia is wide-ranging, encompassing multiple perspectives from neuroscience to sociology. Scientists have yet to pinpoint the exact causes. Studies suggest that genetics can play a part in combination with environmental factors. Social phobia is not caused by other mental disorders or substance use.
Generally, social anxiety begins at a specific point in an individual's life. This will develop over time as the person struggles to recover. Eventually, mild social awkwardness can develop into symptoms of social anxiety or phobia. Passive social media usage may cause social anxiety in some people.

Genetics
It has been shown that there is a two to a threefold greater risk of having social phobia if a first-degree relative also has the disorder. This could be due to genetics and/or due to children acquiring social fears and avoidance through processes of observational learning or parental psychosocial education. Studies of identical twins brought up (via adoption) in different families have indicated that, if one twin developed social anxiety disorder, then the other was between 30 percent and 50 percent more likely than average to also develop the disorder. To some extent, this "heritability" may not be specific – for example, studies have found that if a parent has any kind of anxiety disorder or clinical depression, then a child is somewhat more likely to develop an anxiety disorder or social phobia. Studies suggest that parents of those with social anxiety disorder tend to be more socially isolated themselves (Bruch and Heimberg, 1994; Caster et al., 1999), and shyness in adoptive parents is significantly correlated with shyness in adopted children (Daniels and Plomin, 1985).

Growing up with overprotective and hypercritical parents has also been associated with social anxiety disorder. Adolescents who were rated as having an insecure (anxious-ambivalent) attachment with their mother as infants were twice as likely to develop anxiety disorders by late adolescence, including social phobia.

A related line of research has investigated 'behavioural inhibition' in infants – early signs of an inhibited and introspective or fearful nature. Studies have shown that around 10–15 percent of individuals show this early temperament, which appears to be partly due to genetics. Some continue to show this trait into adolescence and adulthood and appear to be more likely to develop a social anxiety disorder.

Social experiences
A previous negative social experience can be a trigger to social phobia, perhaps particularly for individuals high in "interpersonal sensitivity". For around half of those diagnosed with social anxiety disorder, a specific traumatic or humiliating social event appears to be associated with the onset or worsening of the disorder; this kind of event appears to be particularly related to specific social phobia, for example, regarding public speaking (Stemberg et al., 1995). As well as direct experiences, observing or hearing about the socially negative experiences of others (e.g. a faux pas committed by someone), or verbal warnings of social problems and dangers, may also make the development of a social anxiety disorder more likely. Social anxiety disorder may be caused by the longer-term effects of not fitting in, or being bullied, rejected, or ignored. Shy adolescents or avoidant adults have emphasized unpleasant experiences with peers or childhood bullying or harassment. In one study, popularity was found to be negatively correlated with social anxiety, and children who were neglected by their peers reported higher social anxiety and fear of negative evaluation than other categories of children. Socially phobic children appear less likely to receive positive reactions from peers, and anxious or inhibited children may isolate themselves.

Cultural influences
Cultural factors that have been related to social anxiety disorder include a society's attitude towards shyness and avoidance, affecting the ability to form relationships or access employment or education, and shame. One study found that the effects of parenting are different depending on the culture: American children appear more likely to develop social anxiety disorder if their parents emphasize the importance of others' opinions and use shame as a disciplinary strategy (Leung et al., 1994), but this association was not found for Chinese/Chinese-American children. In China, research has indicated that shy-inhibited children are more accepted than their peers and more likely to be considered for leadership and considered competent, in contrast to the findings in Western countries. Purely demographic variables may also play a role.

Problems in developing social skills, or 'social fluency', may be a cause of some social anxiety disorder, through either inability or lack of confidence to interact socially and gain positive reactions and acceptance from others. The studies have been mixed, however, with some studies not finding significant problems in social skills while others have. What does seem clear is that the socially anxious perceive their own social skills to be low. It may be that the increasing need for sophisticated social skills in forming relationships or careers, and an emphasis on assertiveness and competitiveness, is making social anxiety problems more common, at least among the 'middle classes'. An interpersonal or media emphasis on 'normal' or 'attractive' personal characteristics has also been argued to fuel perfectionism and feelings of inferiority or insecurity regarding negative evaluation from others. The need for social acceptance or social standing has been elaborated in other lines of research relating to social anxiety.

Substance-induced
While alcohol initially relieves social phobia, excessive alcohol misuse can worsen social phobia symptoms and cause panic disorder to develop or worsen during alcohol intoxication and especially during alcohol withdrawal syndrome. This effect is not unique to alcohol but can also occur with long-term use of drugs that have a similar mechanism of action to alcohol such as the benzodiazepines which are sometimes prescribed as tranquillisers.
Benzodiazepines possess anti-anxiety properties and can be useful for the short-term treatment of severe anxiety. Like the anticonvulsants, they tend to be mild and well-tolerated, although there is a risk of habit-forming. Benzodiazepines are usually administered orally for the treatment of anxiety; however, occasionally lorazepam or diazepam may be given intravenously for the treatment of panic attacks.

The World Council of Anxiety does not recommend benzodiazepines for the long-term treatment of anxiety due to a range of problems associated with long-term use including tolerance, psychomotor impairment, cognitive and memory impairments, physical dependence and a benzodiazepine withdrawal syndrome upon discontinuation of benzodiazepines. Despite increasing focus on the use of antidepressants and other agents for the treatment of anxiety, benzodiazepines have remained a mainstay of anxiolytic pharmacotherapy due to their robust efficacy, rapid onset of therapeutic effect, and generally favorable side effect profile. Treatment patterns for psychotropic drugs appear to have remained stable over the past decade, with benzodiazepines being the most commonly used medication for panic disorder.

Many people who are addicted to alcohol or prescribed benzodiazepines when it is explained to them they have a choice between ongoing ill mental health or quitting and recovering from their symptoms decide on quitting alcohol or their benzodiazepines. Symptoms may temporarily worsen however, during alcohol withdrawal or benzodiazepine withdrawal.

Psychological factors
Research has indicated the role of 'core' or 'unconditional' negative beliefs (e.g. "I am inept") and 'conditional' beliefs nearer to the surface (e.g. "If I show myself, I will be rejected"). They are thought to develop based on personality and adverse experiences and to be activated when the person feels under threat. Recent research has also highlighted that conditional beliefs may also be at play (e.g., "If people see I'm anxious, they'll think that I'm weak").

A secondary factor is self-concealment which involves concealing the expression of one's anxiety or its underlying beliefs. One line of work has focused more specifically on the key role of self-presentational concerns. The resulting anxiety states are seen as interfering with social performance and the ability to concentrate on interaction, which in turn creates more social problems, which strengthens the negative schema. Also highlighted has been a high focus on and worry about anxiety symptoms themselves and how they might appear to others. A similar model emphasizes the development of a distorted mental representation of the self and overestimates of the likelihood and consequences of negative evaluation, and of the performance standards that others have. Such cognitive-behavioral models consider the role of negatively biased memories of the past and the processes of rumination after an event, and fearful anticipation before it.

Studies have also highlighted the role of subtle avoidance and defensive factors, and shown how attempts to avoid feared negative evaluations or use of 'safety behaviors' (Clark & Wells, 1995) can make social interaction more difficult and the anxiety worse in the long run. This work has been influential in the development of Cognitive Behavioral Therapy for social anxiety disorder, which has been shown to have efficacy.

Mechanisms
There are many studies investigating neural bases of social anxiety disorder. Although the exact neural mechanisms have not been found yet, there is evidence relating social anxiety disorder to imbalance in some neurochemicals and hyperactivity in some brain areas.

Neurotransmitters
Sociability is closely tied to dopaminergic neurotransmission. In a 2011 study, a direct relation between social status of volunteers and binding affinity of dopamine D2/3 receptors in the striatum was found. Other research shows that the binding affinity of dopamine D2 receptors in the striatum of people with social anxiety is lower than in controls. Some other research shows an abnormality in dopamine transporter density in the striatum of those with social anxiety. However, some researchers have been unable to replicate previous findings of evidence of dopamine abnormality in social anxiety disorder. Studies have shown high prevalence of social anxiety in Parkinson's disease and schizophrenia. In a recent study, social phobia was diagnosed in 50% of Parkinson's disease patients. Other researchers have found social phobia symptoms in patients treated with dopamine antagonists like haloperidol, emphasizing the role of dopamine neurotransmission in social anxiety disorder.

Some evidence points to the possibility that social anxiety disorder involves reduced serotonin receptor binding. A recent study reports increased serotonin transporter binding in psychotropic medication-naive patients with generalized social anxiety disorder. Although there is little evidence of abnormality in serotonin neurotransmission, the limited efficacy of medications which affect serotonin levels may indicate the role of this pathway. Paroxetine, sertraline and fluvoxamine are three SSRIs that have been approved by the FDA to treat social anxiety disorder. Some researchers believe that SSRIs decrease the activity of the amygdala. There is also increasing focus on other candidate transmitters, e.g. norepinephrine and glutamate, which may be over-active in social anxiety disorder, and the inhibitory transmitter GABA, which may be under-active in the thalamus.

Brain areas
The amygdala is part of the limbic system which is related to fear cognition and emotional learning. Individuals with social anxiety disorder have been found to have a hypersensitive amygdala; for example in relation to social threat cues (e.g. perceived negative evaluation by another person), angry or hostile faces, and while waiting to give a speech. Recent research has also indicated that another area of the brain, the anterior cingulate cortex, which was already known to be involved in the experience of physical pain, also appears to be involved in the experience of 'social pain', for example perceiving group exclusion. Recent research also highlighted the potent role of the prefrontal cortex, especially its dorsolateral part, in the maintenance of cognitive biases involved in SAD. A 2007 meta-analysis also found that individuals with social anxiety had hyperactivation in the amygdala and insula areas which are frequently associated with fear and negative emotional processing.

Diagnosis
ICD-10 defines social phobia as fear of scrutiny by other people leading to avoidance of social situations. The anxiety symptoms may present as a complaint of blushing, hand tremor, nausea, or urgency of micturition. Symptoms may progress to panic attacks.

Standardized rating scales such as the Social Phobia Inventory, the SPAI-B, Liebowitz Social Anxiety Scale, and the Social Interaction Anxiety Scale can be used to screen for social anxiety disorder and measure the severity of anxiety.

DSM-V Diagnosis
DSM-5 defines Social Anxiety Disorder as a marked, or intense, fear or anxiety of social situations in which the individual may be scrutinized by others.

DSM-5 Diagnostic Criteria with Diagnostic Features:
Marked fear or anxiety about one or more social situations in which the individual is exposed to possible scrutiny by others. Examples include social interactions (e.g., having a conversation, meeting unfamiliar people), being observed (e.g., eating or drinking), and performing in front of others (e.g., giving a speech). Note: In children, the anxiety must occur in peer settings and not just during interactions with adults.
The individual fears that he or she will act in a way or show anxiety symptoms that will be negatively evaluated (i.e., will be humiliating or embarrassing: will lead to rejection or offend others). When exposed to such social situations, the individual fears that he or she will be negatively evaluated. The individual is concerned that he or she will be judged as anxious, weak, crazy, stupid, boring, intimidating, dirty, or unlikable. The individual fears that he or she will act or appear in a certain way or show anxiety symptoms, such as blushing, trembling, sweating, stumbling over one's words, or staring, that will be negatively evaluated by others.
The social situations almost always provoke fear or anxiety. Thus, an individual who becomes anxious only occasionally in the social situation(s) would not be diagnosed with social anxiety disorder. Note: In children, the fear or anxiety may be expressed by crying, tantrums, freezing, clinging, shrinking, or failing to speak in social situations.
The social situations are avoided. Alternatively, the situations are endured with intense fear or anxiety.
The fear or anxiety is out of proportion to the actual threat posed by the social situation and to the sociocultural context. The fear or anxiety is judged to be out of proportion to the actual risk of being negatively evaluated or to the consequences of such negative evaluation. Sometimes, the anxiety may not be judged to be excessive, because it is related to an actual danger (e.g., being bullied or tormented by others). However, individuals with social anxiety disorder often overestimate the negative consequences of social situations, and thus the judgment of being out of proportion is made by the clinician.
The fear, anxiety, or avoidance is persistent, typically lasting for 6 months or more. This duration threshold helps distinguish the disorder from transient social fears that are common, particularly among children and in the community. However, the duration criterion should be used as a general guide, with allowance for some degree of flexibility.
The fear, anxiety, or avoidance causes clinically significant distress or impairment in social, occupational, or other important areas of functioning. The fear, anxiety, and avoidance must interfere significantly with the individual's normal routine, occupational or academic functioning, or social activities or relationships, or must cause clinically significant distress or impairment in social, occupational, or other important areas of functioning. For example, an individual who is afraid to speak in public would not receive a diagnosis of social anxiety disorder if this activity is not routinely encountered on the job or in classroom work, and if the individual is not significantly distressed about it. However, if the individual avoids, or is passed over for, the job or education he or she really wants because of social anxiety symptoms criterion is met.
The fear, anxiety, or avoidance is not attributable to the physiological effects of a substance (e.g., an addictive substance, a medication) or another medical condition.
The fear, anxiety, or avoidance is not better explained by the symptoms of another mental disorder, such as panic disorder, body dysmorphic disorder, or autism spectrum disorder.
If another medical condition (e.g., Parkinson disease, obesity, disfigurement from burns or injury) is present, the fear, anxiety, or avoidance is clearly unrelated or is excessive.

If the fear is restricted to speaking or performing in public it is performance only social anxiety disorder.

Differential diagnosis
The DSM-IV criteria stated that an individual cannot receive a diagnosis of social anxiety disorder if their symptoms are better accounted for by one of the autism spectrum disorders such as autism and Asperger syndrome.

Because of its close relationship and overlapping symptoms, treating people with social phobia may help understand the underlying connections to other mental disorders. Social anxiety disorder is often linked to bipolar disorder and attention deficit hyperactivity disorder (ADHD) and some believe that they share an underlying cyclothymic-anxious-sensitive disposition. The co-occurrence of ADHD and social phobia is very high, especially when SCT symptoms are present.

Prevention
Prevention of anxiety disorders is one focus of research. Use of CBT and related techniques may decrease the number of children with social anxiety disorder following completion of prevention programs.

Treatment

Psychotherapies
The first-line treatment for social anxiety disorder is cognitive behavioral therapy (CBT) with medications such as selective serotonin reuptake inhibitors (SSRIs) used only in those who are not interested in therapy. Self-help based on principles of CBT is a second-line treatment.

There is some emerging evidence for the use of acceptance and commitment therapy (ACT) in the treatment of social anxiety disorder. ACT is considered an offshoot of traditional CBT and emphasizes accepting unpleasant symptoms rather than fighting against them, as well as psychological flexibility – the ability to adapt to changing situational demands, to shift one's perspective, and to balance competing desires. ACT may be useful as a second line treatment for this disorder in situations where CBT is ineffective or refused.

Some studies have suggested social skills training (SST) can help with social anxiety. Examples of social skills focused on during SST for social anxiety disorder include: initiating conversations, establishing friendships, interacting with members of the preferred sex, constructing a speech and assertiveness skills. However, it is not clear whether specific social skills techniques and training are required, rather than just support with general social functioning and exposure to social situations.

There is some evidence that expressive therapies (e.g. painting, drawing or musical therapy) can be effective for treating social anxiety disorder in certain contexts. A 2019 study, for example, found that art therapy produced an "increase in subjective quality of life (both with large effects) and an improvement in accessibility of emotion regulation strategies" in adult women with anxiety. Both VAGA and the American Art Therapy Association run specific workshops for social anxiety disorder.

Furthermore, error-related brain activity varies in accordance to factors that affect the motivational significance of behavioural performance, such as social contexts and personality traits, suggesting that understanding how individuals appraise the relevance of incentives in a given context is crucial for designing interventions to ameliorate or prevent maladaptive patterns of performance evaluation, particularly with regards to social anxiety disorder and substance abuse.

Given the evidence that social anxiety disorder may predict subsequent development of other psychiatric disorders such as depression, early diagnosis and treatment is important. Social anxiety disorder remains under-recognized in primary care practice, with patients often presenting for treatment only after the onset of complications such as clinical depression or substance use disorders.

Medications

SSRIs
Selective serotonin reuptake inhibitors (SSRIs), a class of antidepressants, are the first choice of medication for generalized social phobia but a second-line treatment. Compared to older forms of medication, there is less risk of tolerability and drug dependency associated with SSRIs.

Paroxetine and paroxetine CR, Sertraline, Escitalopram, Venlafaxine XR and Fluvoxamine CR (luvox CR) are all approved for SAD and are all effective for it, especially paroxetine. All SSRIs are somewhat effective for social anxiety except fluoxetine which was equivalent to placebo in all clinical trials. Paroxetine was able to change personality and significantly increase extraversion.

In a 1995 double-blind, placebo-controlled trial, the SSRI paroxetine was shown to result in clinically meaningful improvement in 55% of patients with generalized social anxiety disorder, compared with 23.9% of those taking placebo. An October 2004 study yielded similar results. Patients were treated with either fluoxetine, psychotherapy, or a placebo. The first four sets saw improvement in 50.8 to 54.2 percent of the patients. Of those assigned to receive only a placebo, 31.7% achieved a rating of 1 or 2 on the Clinical Global Impression-Improvement scale. Those who sought both therapy and medication did not see a boost in improvement. In double-blind, placebo-controlled trials other SSRIs like fluvoxamine, escitalopram and sertraline showed reduction of social anxiety symptoms, including anxiety, sensitivity to rejection and hostility.

Citalopram also appears to be effective.

General side-effects are common during the first weeks while the body adjusts to the drug. Symptoms may include headaches, nausea, insomnia and changes in sexual behavior. Treatment safety during pregnancy has not been established. In late 2004 much media attention was given to a proposed link between SSRI use and suicidality [a term that encompasses suicidal ideation and attempts at suicide as well as suicide]. For this reason, [although evidential causality between SSRI use and actual suicide has not been demonstrated] the use of SSRIs in pediatric cases of depression is now recognized by the Food and Drug Administration as warranting a cautionary statement to the parents of children who may be prescribed SSRIs by a family doctor. Recent studies have shown no increase in rates of suicide. These tests, however, represent those diagnosed with depression, not necessarily with social anxiety disorder.

In addition, studies show that more socially phobic patients treated with anti-depressant medication develop hypomania than non-phobic controls. The hypomania can be seen as the medication creating a new problem.

Other drugs
Other prescription drugs are also used, if other methods are not effective. Before the introduction of SSRIs, monoamine oxidase inhibitors (MAOIs) such as phenelzine were frequently used in the treatment of social anxiety. Evidence continues to indicate that MAOIs are effective in the treatment and management of social anxiety disorder and they are still used, but generally only as a last resort medication, owing to concerns about dietary restrictions, possible adverse drug interactions and a recommendation of multiple doses per day. A newer type of this medication, reversible inhibitors of monoamine oxidase subtype A (RIMAs) such as the drug moclobemide, bind reversibly to the MAO-A enzyme, greatly reducing the risk of hypertensive crisis with dietary tyramine intake. However, RIMAs have been found to be less efficacious for social anxiety disorder than irreversible MAOIs like phenelzine.

Benzodiazepines are an alternative to SSRIs. These drugs' recommended usage is for short-term relief, meaning a limited time frame of over a year, of severe, disabling anxiety. Although benzodiazepines are still sometimes prescribed for long-term everyday use in some countries, there is concern over the development of drug tolerance, dependency and misuse. It has been recommended that benzodiazepines be considered only for individuals who fail to respond to other medications. Benzodiazepines augment the action of GABA, the major inhibitory neurotransmitter in the brain; effects usually begin to appear within minutes or hours. In most patients, tolerance rapidly develops to the sedative effects of benzodiazepines, but not to the anxiolytic effects. Long-term use of a benzodiazepine may result in physical dependence, and abrupt discontinuation of the drug should be avoided due to high potential for withdrawal symptoms (including tremor, insomnia, and in rare cases, seizures). A gradual tapering of the dose of clonazepam (a decrease of 0.25 mg every 2 weeks), however, is well tolerated by patients with social anxiety disorder. Benzodiazepines are not recommended as monotherapy for patients who have major depression in addition to social anxiety disorder and should be avoided in patients with a history of substance use.

Certain anticonvulsant drugs such as gabapentin and pregabalin are effective in social anxiety disorder and may be a possible treatment alternative to benzodiazepines. However there is concern regarding their off-label use due to the lack of strong scientific evidence for their efficacy and their proven side effects.

Serotonin-norepinephrine reuptake inhibitors (SNRIs) such as venlafaxine have shown similar effectiveness to the SSRIs. In Japan, Milnacipran is used in the treatment of Taijin kyofusho, a Japanese variant of social anxiety disorder. The atypical antidepressants mirtazapine and bupropion have been studied for the treatment of social anxiety disorder, and rendered mixed results.

Some people with a form of social phobia called performance phobia have been helped by beta-blockers, which are more commonly used to control high blood pressure. Taken in low doses, they control the physical manifestation of anxiety and can be taken before a public performance.

A novel treatment approach has recently been developed as a result of translational research. It has been shown that a combination of acute dosing of d-cycloserine (DCS) with exposure therapy facilitates the effects of exposure therapy of social phobia. DCS is an old antibiotic medication used for treating tuberculosis and does not have any anxiolytic properties per se. However, it acts as an agonist at the glutamatergic N-methyl-D-aspartate (NMDA) receptor site, which is important for learning and memory.

Kava-kava has also attracted attention as a possible treatment, although safety concerns exist.

Epidemiology

Social anxiety disorder is known to appear at an early age in most cases. Fifty percent of those who develop this disorder have developed it by the age of 11, and 80% have developed it by age 20. This early age of onset may lead to people with social anxiety disorder being particularly vulnerable to depressive illnesses, substance use, and other psychological conflicts.

When prevalence estimates were based on the examination of psychiatric clinic samples, social anxiety disorder was thought to be a relatively rare disorder. The opposite was found to be true; social anxiety was common, but many were afraid to seek psychiatric help, leading to an underrecognition of the problem.

The National Comorbidity Survey of over 8,000 American correspondents in 1994 revealed 12-month and lifetime prevalence rates of 7.9 percent and 13.3 percent, respectively; this makes it the third most prevalent psychiatric disorder after depression and alcohol use disorder, and the most common of the anxiety disorders. According to US epidemiological data from the National Institute of Mental Health, social phobia affects 15 million adult Americans in any given year. Estimates vary within 2 percent and 7 percent of the U.S. adult population.

The mean onset of social phobia is 10 to 13 years. Onset after age 25 is rare and is typically preceded by panic disorder or major depression. Social anxiety disorder occurs more often in females than males. The prevalence of social phobia appears to be increasing among white, married, and well-educated individuals. As a group, those with generalized social phobia are less likely to graduate from high school and are more likely to rely on government financial assistance or have poverty-level salaries. Surveys carried out in 2002 show the youth of England, Scotland, and Wales have a prevalence rate of 0.4 percent, 1.8 percent, and 0.6 percent, respectively. In Canada, the prevalence of self-reported social anxiety for Nova Scotians older than 14 years was 4.2 percent in June 2004 with women (4.6 percent) reporting more than men (3.8 percent). In Australia, social phobia is the 8th and 5th leading disease or illness for males and females between 15 and 24 years of age as of 2003. Because of the difficulty in separating social phobia from poor social skills or shyness, some studies have a large range of prevalence. The table also shows higher prevalence in Sweden.

Terminology
Other names have included interpersonal relation phobia. A specific Japanese cultural form is known as taijin kyofusho.

See also

Alexithymia
Agoraphobia
Asociality
Highly sensitive person
Impostor syndrome
Obsessive-compulsive disorder
Phobia
Scopophobia
Selective mutism
Social inhibition
Social rejection

References

Further reading

Beidel, D. C., & Turner, S. M. (2007). Shy children, phobic adults: Nature and treatment of social anxiety disorders (2nd ed.) (pp. 11–46). Washington, DC US: American Psychological Association. 
Berent, Jonathan, with Amy Lemley (1993). Beyond Shyness: How to Conquer Social Anxieties. New York: Simon & Schuster. .
Boyle, L.E. (2018) "The (un)habitual geographies of Social Anxiety Disorder", Social Science and Medicine, DsocOI:10.1016/j.socscimed.2018.03.002

Burns, D. D. (1999). Feeling Good: the new mood therapy (Rev. ed.). New York: Avon. .
Crozier, W. R., & Alden, L. E. (2001). International Handbook of Social Anxiety: Concepts, Research, and Interventions Relating to the Self and Shyness. New York: John Wiley & Sons, Ltd. .
Hales, R. E., & Yudofsky, S. C. (Eds.). (2003). Social phobia. In Textbook of Clinical Psychiatry (4th ed., pp. 572–580). Washington, D.C.: American Psychiatric Publishing.

External links

Anxiety disorders
Phobias